Dilan 1991 is a 2019 Indonesian language romantic drama film. Like its prequel, the film is also based on Dilan novel series written by Pidi Baiq, this is from Dilan Bagian Kedua: Dia adalah Dilanku tahun 1991 (Dilan Part Two: He is My Dilan in 1991). The film sold more than 5 million tickets as of 17 March 2019.

Plot
Milea, now in a relationship with Dilan, faces problems. He is involved in an aggressive motorbike gang of his school, engaging in fights every other day. This eventually leads him to get expelled from the school. She still tries to understand him and does not let the relationship get affected. Meanwhile, her cousin Yugo comes home from Belgium, and started acting incestuous towards Milea, which makes her uncomfortable.

One night, she sees Dilan planning an attack late at night, threatening him that she will break up if he does not mend his ways. Seeing Yugo as a foreign man in the car, Dilan does not see this as a threat and thus continues, to the point where he is caught for being involved in an attack using his father's pistol and ends up going to jail. One day, Milea's parents advise her to guide Yugo around Bandung. In a cinema, Yugo tries to kiss Milea; she runs away from the mall in rage and asks Yugo not to see her again. In an apology meeting, Milea brings Dilan with her and uses him to scare off Yugo.

Milea learns that Dilan is involved in another attack; this time he is kicked out by his mom and thus refuges at the gang leader's house, along with a lot of other members. Milea slaps him, tired of his involvement in problems, and declares breakup. Dilan insists on taking her home and she relents after much compelling. She is protected by Dilan's mother who lectures him at a stadium. He walks away, leaving Milea crying under his mother's shoulders. The film then fast-forwards in time, showing Milea graduating college and her family moving out of their home.

In 1995 in Jakarta, when they're adults, Milea, now married to her college friend Herdi, sees Dilan at an office building that the three of them work at. Dilan tells her that he is leaving for Surabaya that night. Milea instantly try to catch the train he is leaving from. She sees someone that looks like Dilan but is not. Knowing that the train left, she sits on the bench and cries. In 2018 at Milea's apartment, she writes the last few sentences of her memoir, a direct copy of Pidi Baiq's novel which the film is based on.

Cast

 Iqbaal Ramadhan as Dilan
 Vanesha Prescilla as young Milea Adnan Hussain
 Sissy Priscillia as adult Milea Adnan Hussain (voice only, narrator)
 Jerome Kurnia as Yugo, Milea's distant relative
 Omara Esteghlal as Piyan
 Zulfa Maharani as Rani
 Yoriko Angeline as Wati
 Andryos Aryanto as Nandan
 Adhisty Zara (Zara JKT48) as Disa, Dilan's younger sister
 Moira Tabina Zayn as Airin, Milea's sister
 Ira Wibowo as Dilan's mother
 Bucek Depp as Lt. Faisal, Dilan's father
 Farhan as Milea's father
 Happy Salma as Milea's mother
 Andovi da Lopez as Mas Herdi, adult Milea's boyfriend
 Maudy Koesnaedi as Tante Anis, Yugo's mother
 TJ as Anhar's mother
 Teuku Rifnu Wikana as Pak Suripto
 Refal Hady as Kang Adi
 Gusti Rayhan as Hendri Wijaya (Akew)
 Tike Priatnakusumah as Bi' E'em
 Ridwan Kamil as Headmaster
 Teddy Snada as Vice Headmaster
 Brandon Salim as Benni
 Iang Darmawan as Pak Rahmat
 Aris Nugraha as Pak Atam
 Inten Leony as Ibu Sri
 Ira Ratih as Ibu Rini
 Polo Reza as Burhan
 Azzura Pinkania Imanda as Revi

Accolades

See also
 Milea: Suara dari Dilan, its sequel

References

External links
 

2019 films
2019 romantic drama films
Films based on Indonesian novels
Indonesian romantic drama films
Indonesian sequel films
Indonesian high school films
Films directed by Fajar Bustomi
Films directed by Pidi Baiq